Starve Island is an island of the U.S. state of Ohio located in Lake Erie.  The  island is about a mile (1.6 km) south of South Bass Island.  In normal weather conditions it is visible for only a mile or two, as some rocks and a few shrubs poking up from the lake, and is the second smallest of the Lake Erie Islands (the smallest is Turtle Island). The island can be seen from the top of Perry's Victory and International Peace Memorial in Put-in-Bay.

It is said that the island gets its name from a sailor's fate upon the island following a shipwreck. Variant names for the island include Dinner Island and Glacial Island.

Island and reef are both located in Put-in-Bay Township, Ottawa County, Ohio.

References 

Islands of Ottawa County, Ohio
Islands of Lake Erie in Ohio